Azni (also Romanized as Aznī and Azenī; also known as Owlīkā) is a village in Chahardangeh Rural District, Chahardangeh District, Sari County, Mazandaran Province, Iran. At the 2006 census, its population was 246, in 70 families.

References 

Populated places in Sari County